T-113 was a minesweeper of the Soviet Navy during World War II and the Cold War. Upon completion she was transferred to the Soviet Union under Lend-Lease as T-113; she was never returned to the United States. The ship was eventually scrapped on 14 March 1960. Because of the Cold War, the U.S. Navy was unaware of this fate and the vessel remained on the American Naval Vessel Register until she was struck on 1 January 1983.

Career 
Alarm was laid down on 8 June 1942 at Tampa, Florida, by the Tampa Shipbuilding Co.; launched in December 1942; sponsored by Mrs. M. A. Lynch; and completed on 5 August 1943. She was transferred to the Soviet Navy that same day as T-113. She was never returned to U.S. custody and was scuttled by the Soviet Navy in the Barents Sea in 1956.

In Soviet service the vessel was renamed BSH-EYA on 8 October 1955. She was eventually scrapped on 14 March 1960.

Due to the ongoing Cold War, the U.S. Navy was unaware of this fate. They had reclassified the vessel as MSF-140 on 7 February 1955, and kept her on the American Naval Vessel Register until she was struck on 1 January 1983.

References

External links
 NavSource Online: Mine Warfare Vessel Photo Archive – Alarm (MSF 140) – ex-AM-140 – ex-AMc-117

Admirable-class minesweepers
Ships built in Tampa, Florida
1942 ships
World War II minesweepers of the United States
Admirable-class minesweepers of the Soviet Navy
World War II minesweepers of the Soviet Union
Cold War minesweepers of the Soviet Union